The 2014–15 season was the 94th season of competitive football for Rochdale. Rochdale returned to Football League One for 2014–15 following promotion in 2013–14 Football League Two.

Rochdale began the season on 9 August 2014, with the opening game of their League One campaign. They also competed in the two domestic cups, the FA Cup and the League Cup.

Background
Rochdale finished third in the League two last season meaning that they gained automatic promotion to League One. Scott Hogan, George Donnelly and Matt Done left the club. Rochdale completed their first signing of the season on 15 May 2014 with the acquisition of Jack Muldoon from Workshop Town on a free transfer, and followed this up in the following five days with Sean McGinty from Sheffield United.

Statistics

																								

|}

Players

Squad information

Goalscorers
Includes all competitive matches. The list is sorted alphabetically by surname when total goals are equal.

Correct as of match played on 25  May 2015

Match details

Pre-season

League One

League table

Matches
The fixtures for the 2014–15 season were announced on 18 June 2014 at 9am.

FA Cup

The draw for the first round of the FA Cup was made on 27 October 2014.

League Cup

The draw for the first round was made on 17 June 2014 at 10am. Rochdale were drawn at home to Preston North End.

Football League Trophy

Transfers

In

Out

Loans in

Loans out

References

Rochdale A.F.C. seasons
Rochdale